S. F. Sorrow is the fourth album by the English rock band Pretty Things. Released in 1968, it is known as one of the first rock operas ever released. Based on a short story by singer Phil May, the album is structured as a song cycle telling the story of a main character "Sebastian F. Sorrow", from his birth, through love, war, tragedy, madness, and his disillusionment with old age.

Concept 
S. F. Sorrow story is told by the Pretty Things, who relate the bulk of the narrative through small paragraphs as chapters, which were printed in liner notes of LP and CD's. The narrative alternates from spoken word to sung lyrics; these passages were read and sung in performances by Arthur Brown, during The Pretty Things' two live performances of the opera.

S. F. Sorrow opens with the birth of the story's protagonist at the turn of the 20th century. Sebastian F. Sorrow is born in a small nameless town to ordinary parents in a house called "Number Three". The town is supported by a factory of some sort, referred to as the "Misery Factory". ("S. F. Sorrow Is Born") Sorrow, an imaginative boy, has a relatively normal childhood until it ends abruptly when he needs to get a job. He goes to work with his father at the Misery Factory, from which many men have been laid off. This might make S. F. Sorrow the object of hate in a sense that he might be a scab in the story, or perhaps the young boy who is taking some older man's job, and he comes into his sexual adolescence during this period ("Bracelets of Fingers"). From here, joy exists for him in the form of a girl across the street. She says 'Good morning' to him every day, and he thinks about her constantly. This is the factor that keeps him going despite his childhood's abrupt ending. The two fall in love and become engaged, but their marriage plans are cut short when Sorrow is drafted ("She Says Good Morning").Sorrow joins a light infantry ("Private Sorrow") and goes off to fight in a war, possibly World War I. Sorrow sinks into a daze, living out the entire war in a funk. Soon the sounds of gunfire and artillery become the rhythm to his life in a daydream. He survives the war and settles down in a land called "Amerik" (obviously referring to the country America, because the first words of the song "Balloon Burning" are "New York"). Sorrow's fiancée travels by a balloon, the Windenberg (Hindenburg) to join him, but it bursts into flame at arrival ("Balloon Burning"), killing all aboard. Sorrow is left alone, his beloved fiancée dead ("Death").

Sorrow drifts into a state of depression that leads him on an epic journey to the center of his subconscious. When wandering the streets, he encounters the mysterious Baron Saturday (a character intended to represent Baron Samedi, a deity in Haitian Voodoo religion). The black-cloaked Saturday invites Sorrow to take a journey and then, without waiting for a response, "borrows his eyes" and initiates a trip through the Underworld ("Baron Saturday").

A trippy quest begins by taking flight into the air where Sorrow is driven by a whip-cracking Baron Saturday. Sorrow thinks he is flying toward the moon, but instead sees that it is his own face. The Baron pushes him through the mouth of the face and then down the throat, where they find a set of oak doors. Saturday throws them open and prompts S. F. Sorrow inside, where he finds a room full of mirrors ("The Journey"). Each mirror shows a memory from his childhood, which Baron Saturday suggests that he studies well. After the hall of mirrors comes a long winding staircase which brings him to two opaque mirrors that show him the horrible truths and revelations from his life ("I See You").

Sorrow is destroyed by his journey; it leads him to understand that no one can be trusted, and that society will only do away with you when you become old and serve it no longer ("Trust"). He is driven into a dark mental seclusion where he suffers from eternal loneliness. Much like Pink Floyd's The Wall, a similar rock opera, S. F. Sorrow is the tale of a man who has endured hardships which he uses to build into a mental wall that cuts him off from the rest of the waking world, and leaves them without light ("Old Man Going"). At the end of the album he identifies himself as "the loneliest person in the world" ("Loneliest Person").

Recording and production
In September 1967, after the end of their contract with Fontana Records, the Pretty Things signed with EMI. Their first release on their new label was the single "Defecting Grey" in November, a psychedelic experiment which served as the maquette for S. F. Sorrow.

Recording of S. F. Sorrow began at London's EMI Studios in November 1967 with work on "Bracelets of Fingers". Two tracks that had been earmarked for the album, "Talking About the Good Times" and "Walking Through My Dreams" were released as a single in February 1968. In March 1968, drummer Skip Alan suddenly quit the band to marry his French girlfriend, and Twink (born John Charles Alder), whose band Tomorrow had recently split up, took his place.

Working with noted EMI staff producer Norman "Hurricane" Smith (who had engineered earlier Beatles recordings and produced Pink Floyd's The Piper at the Gates of Dawn) and house engineer Peter Mew, the band experimented with the latest sound technology, including the Mellotron and early electronic tone generators, often employing gadgets and techniques devised on the spot by Abbey Road's technicians.

Phil May has emphatically stated that Smith was the only person at EMI who was fully supportive of the project, and that his technical expertise was invaluable to the ambitious, experimental sound of the album; May once even referred to Smith as a "sixth member" of the band. This attitude was in marked contrast to Pink Floyd's unhappiness with Smith.

Release
Work on the album concluded in September 1968 with the recording of what would be its closing track, "Loneliest Person". "Private Sorrow" and "Balloon Burning" were used for an October 1968 single, an album was released the following month, in the same week as the Beatles' White Album, and the Kinks' The Kinks Are the Village Green Preservation Society. Due to budget constraints, the band members had to take care of the sleeve design themselves: the cover art featured a drawing by Phil May, while Dick Taylor took the photograph for the back sleeve. The record company, EMI, did little to promote the album, and it was not released in the US by EMI or its affiliates at that time.

Over six months later, Motown picked up the album as one of the first releases for their newly created Rare Earth label which was meant for rock music. By that time, however, Tommy had already been out for months, and S. F. Sorrow was considered to be inferior. Members of the Who have claimed that S. F. Sorrow did not have an influence on Pete Townshend or his writing of Tommy. The Pretty Things and several critics disagree with The Who. 

In Rolling Stone, Lester Bangs termed it "an ultra-pretentious concept album, complete with strained 'story' (A Man's Life from rural birth to Prodigal's Oliver Twist freakout), like some grossly puerile cross between the Bee Gees, Tommy, and the Moody Blues" – "who should be shot for what they've done to English rock lyrics." The American version of the album was poorly mastered (with a one channel volume drop on "Baron Saturday" running over 30 seconds), it was not well promoted by Motown. The redesigned album sleeve also hurt sales: the artwork was entirely different, and on early copies the jacket had a rounded top, such rounding could cause the album to be unseen, causing potential buyers browsing through album racks to miss it.

Live performances
Shortly after the album's release in 1968, the band attempted to perform the album onstage at Middle Earth Club in London. It was by all accounts a strange show which featured the band miming to the EMI backing tracks. Each member also played various characters; Twink played Sorrow while wearing a leotard, white face make up and indulging in his penchant for mime. After that, a handful of songs from the album became part of their typical live set notably "She Says Good Morning", "Balloon Burning" and "Old Man Going".

On 6 September 1998, the line up who recorded the original album – excepting Twink – returned to Abbey Road Studio 2 to perform a fully live version of the album for one of the first netcasts. Joining them were Arthur Brown who provided the narration, David Gilmour who added lead guitar parts on a handful of songs, Skip Alan's son Dov on percussion, Frank Holland on guitar and vocals and manager Mark St. John on percussion. The ensemble performed to a specially invited audience of friends and family. The netcast server was quickly overloaded so barely anyone got to see it live as intended. The show was recorded on tape and video. Resurrection was released months later featuring the soundtrack, and a DVD of the show was finally released in 2003.

The same ensemble performed the show again this time to a paying public at The Royal Festival Hall in London on 19 October 2001. Plans to perform the show in Paris and America never came to fruition and neither did a short 40th anniversary tour slated for venues in the UK in January 2009. However, the 2009 incarnation of the Pretty Things featuring May, Taylor, Frank Holland, George Perez, Jack Greenwood and Mark St. John did perform the album onstage on 10 April 2009 at the 5th annual Le Beat Bespoke Weekender sponsored by Mojo'' magazine. Arthur Brown was absent and Phil May chose to abbreviate the narration between the songs.

To this day, "S. F. Sorrow Is Born", "Balloon Burning", "Baron Saturday" and "Old Man Going" regularly appear in the band's set list.

Track listing

Personnel

Pretty Things
 Phil May – vocals
 Dick Taylor – lead guitar, vocals
 Wally Waller – bass, guitar, vocals, wind instruments, piano
 Jon Povey – organ, sitar, Mellotron, percussion, vocals
 Skip Alan – drums (on some tracks, quit during recording)
 Twink – drums (on some tracks, replaced Alan), vocals

Production
 Norman Smith – producer
 Peter Mew – engineer
 Ken Scott – engineer on "Bracelets of Fingers" 
 Phil May – sleeve design
 Dick Taylor – photography

See also 

 Album era

References

1968 albums
Concept albums
Pretty Things albums
Rock operas
Albums produced by Norman Smith (record producer)
EMI Columbia Records albums
Repertoire Records albums
Sundazed Records albums
Victor Entertainment albums
Psychedelic rock albums by English artists
Experimental rock albums by English artists